George Washington Triplett (February 18, 1809 – June 25, 1894) was a Confederate politician who served in the Confederate States Congress during the American Civil War.

Biography
Triplett was born in Franklin County, Kentucky. He served in the state House of Representatives in 1840 and in the state Senate from 1848 to 1852.

During the Civil War, he served as a major in the Confederate Army. He was elected and served as a representative from Kentucky to the Second Confederate Congress from 1864 to 1865. After the war he served as a state court judge.                                                    He was buried at Rosehill Elmwood Cemetery.

External links
 Politicalgraveyard.com

1809 births
1894 deaths
Confederate States Army officers
People from Franklin County, Kentucky
Members of the Kentucky House of Representatives
Kentucky state senators
Members of the Confederate House of Representatives from Kentucky
19th-century American politicians
Kentucky state court judges
19th-century American judges